Jafarabad (also Romanized as Ja‘farābād) is a village in Now Bandegan Rural District, Now Bandegan District, Fasa County, Fars Province, Iran. At the 2006 census, its population was 123, in 27 families.

References 

Populated places in Fasa County